Saint John's Group of Schools and University is a group of private Catholic educational institutions run by the Vincentian located in Thailand. It was organized in 1961.

The group consists of:
 Saint John's Kindergarten
 Saint John's School (primary and secondary)
 Saint John's School, Thabom (secondary)
 St. John's International School (British and North American curriculum)
 Saint John's Polytechnic School
 Saint John's Technology School
 Saint John's College of Commerce (English programme)
 Saint John's University

It is possible for a child to enter Saint John's kindergarten at age 2 and finish with a PhD without ever leaving the group. Many of Saint John's staff are alumni of one of Saint John's eight schools.

Saint John's choir
Saint John's School is the home of Saint John's Choir, the first choir in Thailand to win a gold medal at the annual Choir Olympic (Xiamen, Republic of China, 15–26 July 2006).

Gallery

Saint John's Affiliate School Programme
The Saint John's Affiliate School Programme was launched in 2007 with the aim of using Saint John's educational knowledge to improve private schools throughout the Kingdom of Thailand. The programme aims to have one school in each province of Thailand that have the support of Saint John's group of schools in Bangkok. While each school that joins the programme aims to improve educational standard across all subject areas, the two initial points of development focus are English instruction and IT support, as Saint John's group of schools are known to be leading schools in these two areas in the kingdom.  As of May 2008, three schools have been admitted to the affiliation programme:
 Sahavith School, Supanburi
 Banchan College of Technology (BCOT), Udon Thani
 Sunflower Trilingual School, Samut Sakorn

References

External links
Official website

Catholic schools in Thailand
Vincentian schools